Susan Mary Gillian Travers (23 September 1909 – 18 December 2003) was a British nurse and ambulance driver who served in the French Red Cross during the Second World War. She later became the only woman to be enlisted in the French Foreign Legion, having also served in French Indochina, during the First Indochina War.

Early life
Travers was born in Kensington and spent her early years in England, the daughter of Francis Eaton Travers, a Royal Navy Admiral, and his wife Eleanor Catherine.

World War II
At the outbreak of World War 2, Travers joined the French Red Cross as a nurse. Later, she became an ambulance driver with the French Expeditionary Force to Finland in 1939. After the fall of France, she went to London and joined the Free French under de Gaulle. In 1942, she drove a medical doctor of the 1st Free French Division during Operation Exporter in Syria and Lebanon, during which the Allied forces invaded and seized Syria and Lebanon from the Vichy French. She served in the 13th Demi-Brigade of the Foreign Legion as a driver for the medical officer, where she gained the nickname "la Miss".

The 13th Demi-Brigade was incorporated into the 1st Brigade of the 1st Free French Division, commanded by Colonel Marie-Pierre Kœnig. Travers was assigned as the driver to Kœnig. They became lovers.

In May 1942, the 1st Free French Brigade was posted at Bir Hakeim, the southern end of the British Eighth Army's line at Gazala in Libya. As the Panzer Army Africa prepared to attack the British line, Kœnig ordered all women out of the area. The Axis forces attacked on 26 May, initiating the Battle of Gazala. Four German and Italian divisions attacked Bir Hakeim. Not long after, Travers joined a convoy into the rear area, and Kœnig allowed her to return to Bir Hakeim, as it seemed the Axis attack had failed. During the next two weeks, the Axis continued to attack, heavily shelling and bombing Bir Hakeim. During the bombardment, a shell tore off the roof of Kœnig's car. Travers, aided by a Vietnamese driver, fixed it on the spot immediately.

During the night of 11–12 June, 1st FF Brigade evacuated Bir Hakeim, with Travers driving Kœnig's staff car. The column ran into minefields and German machine gun fire. Kœnig ordered Travers to drive at the front of the column. Travers stated:

At 10:30 a.m. on 11 June, the column entered British lines. Travers' vehicle had eleven bullet holes, with a shock absorber destroyed and the brakes unserviceable.

Kœnig was promoted to general, and left the North African theater for higher command and a reunion with his wife. Travers, driving a self-propelled anti-tank gun, remained with the French Foreign Legion. She later  served in the Italian Campaign and the Western Front (in France and Germany), during which she was wounded when she drove over a land mine.

Post-war
After the war, her military status was regularized. She applied to and was formally enrolled in the Légion Étrangère, as an adjudant-chef.

Travers served in Indochina. She married Legion Adjudant-Chef Nicolas Schlegelmilch, who had fought at Bir Hakeim with the 13th Demi-Brigade. In retirement, they lived on the outskirts of Paris. The couple are survived by two sons.

She waited for all the other principals in her life story to die before writing it. Then in 2000, aged 91, assisted by Wendy Holden, she wrote her autobiography, Tomorrow to Be Brave: A Memoir of the Only Woman Ever to Serve in the French Foreign Legion.

Decorations 
 Légion d'honneur
 Croix de Guerre
 Médaille commémorative 1939–1945 with clasp – "Afrique" – "Italie" – "Libération"
 Médaille Coloniale, du mérite syrien de 4e classe
  Croix de libération finlandaise
 Officier de l'Ordre du Nichan Iftikhar 
 Médaille militaire

Notes

References

External links
(German) La Miss und die Legionäre, Der Spiegel, 34/2001

1909 births
2003 deaths
British memoirists
Soldiers of the French Foreign Legion
Recipients of the Croix de Guerre (France)
Chevaliers of the Légion d'honneur
French military personnel of World War II
French military personnel of the First Indochina War
Women in war in France
People educated at Heathfield School, Ascot
British women memoirists
French women in World War II
Female recipients of the Croix de Guerre (France)
20th-century memoirists
20th-century French women